Oldfield is a dispersed rural community in the municipality of Chatham-Kent in Southwestern Ontario, Canada. Maxwell Creek flows along the north side of the community.

References

Communities in Chatham-Kent